A pothook (or pot hook) is an S-shaped metal hook for suspending a pot over a fire.

Usage
While one extremity of the pothook is hooked to the handle of the pot, the other is caught upon an iron crane moving on a pivot over the fire. Later stoves obviated the necessity for this arrangement, but in the early twentieth century it was still to be seen in great numbers of country cottages and farmhouse kitchens all over England, and in small artisan's houses in the West Midlands and the North.

Writing
In the elementary teaching of writing, a glyph of similar shape is called a pothook.

Gallery

References and notes

See also 

 Trammel hook

Food preparation utensils
Fire